Netcomics is a publisher of manhwa, webtoons, manga, and comics in the United States, based in Los Angeles, CA, contributing to the Korean Wave. South Korean publisher Ecomix Media Company created NETCOMICS, with the first titles appearing in the first quarter of 2006, and they were considered one of the pioneers in digital publication of manhwa.

They offer a variety of English titles that can be either rented or purchased on their homepage or app.

NETCOMICS served as a distributor for some titles by manga publisher Aurora Publishing until Aurora's closure in April 2010.

References

External links

 Official Site

Manga distributors
Manhwa distributors